There are twenty-one colleges and universities in the U.S. state of North Dakota that are listed under the Carnegie Classification of Institutions of Higher Education. Grand Forks-based University of North Dakota (UND) is the largest public institution with an enrollment of 14,906 students as of Fall 2014 enrollment data. Fargo-based North Dakota State University (NDSU) is the second largest public institution, with an enrollment of 14,747 students for Fall 2014.

UND, founded February 27, 1883 (six years prior to North Dakota's statehood), is the state's oldest and longest operating post-secondary institution. University of Jamestown (UJ), founded under the name Jamestown College October 31, 1883, by the Presbyterian Church, is the state's second-oldest established post-secondary institution. Mayville State University (MSU), originally named Mayville Normal School, founded in 1889 by the first North Dakota Legislative Assembly, is the state's third-oldest established post-secondary institution but is the second longest operating school. NDSU, originally named the North Dakota Agricultural College, was founded 8 March 1890 as part of the Morrill Land-Grant Acts of 1862 and 1890, is the state's fourth-oldest post-secondary institution and third longest operating school.

The North Dakota University System contains eleven public colleges. There are also seven private universities in North Dakota. The University of North Dakota School of Medicine and Health Sciences, a part of UND, is the state's only medical school. The state's only law school is the University of North Dakota School of Law, which is another UND affiliate.

The majority of North Dakota's post-secondary institutions are accredited by the Higher Learning Commission (HLC) (19 in total). Most are accredited by multiple agencies, such as the Commission on Collegiate Nursing Education (CCNE), the National Council for Accreditation of Teacher Education (NCATE), the National League for Nursing (NLNAC), the American Psychological Association (APA), and the Academy of Nutrition and Dietetics.

Extant institutions

Defunct institutions

Fictitious institutions

University of Southern North Dakota at Hoople

Key

See also

 Higher education in the United States
 List of college athletic programs in North Dakota
 List of American institutions of higher education

Notes

References

External links
Department of Education listing of accredited institutions in North Dakota

 
North Dakota
Colleges and universities